The mountains of Wilkes Land are located in the region Wilkes Land, East Antarctica, between 100°31' E and 136°11' E.  Australia claims this region to be part of the Australian Antarctic Territory. The area are highly glaciated. The availability of reliable data for this region is limited, making the list incomplete and inaccurate. The highest peaks, including nunataks and ice domes, are listed below:

References 

 
mountains of Wilkes Land, List